Bulacan State University (BulSU or BSU) is a public university in Bulacan province, Philippines. Its main campus is in Malolos.

BulSU or BSU originated as a secondary school in 1904 ran by the Americans, and has now progressed into one of the biggest educational institutions in Region III.

The university is mandated to provide technical training and to promote research, advanced studies, and progressive leadership. It has been identified by the Commission on Higher Education (CHED) as one of the Center for Excellence and Development institutions in the country and one of the Training Centers nationwide for teachers pursuing education in areas beyond their specialization.

History

Early history 
The Bulacan State University started as an intermediate school in 1904. It was established during the early years of the American occupation by virtue of Act 74 of the Philippine Commission in 1901, which created the then Department of Public Instruction with the mandate to establish schools in every pueblo (town) of the country and reorganize those already existing. Instructions in the intermediate schools established during that time were supplemented with trade or industrial instruction.

In 1907, Bulacan Governor Teodoro Sandiko started to look for funds to put up a trade school for his constituents. His efforts paid off when the intermediate school became the Bulacan Trade School in 1909. The school had an American principal and five teachers, four of whom are Americans, the so-called Thomasites.

Upon the implementation in 1918 of the Philippine Autonomy Act passed by the U.S. Congress in 1916, the Bulacan Trade School was formally turned-over to the Filipinos with Mr. Basilio Abiado as its first Filipino principal.

After World War II 
In 1945, after repairing the damage suffered during the Second World War; the school reopened with a few hand tools and materials donated by the U.S. army stationed in the provincial capitol. With the steady increase in enrollment, more buildings were constructed. In 1949, the United States Information Service (USIS) donated two Quonset huts, which were used as shops and classrooms. In 1951, the two-storey related subjects building was constructed with funds from the War Damage Rehabilitation Fund, and in 1952, the one-storey Girls' Trades building was built with half of the cost of construction was donated by the school's Parent-Teacher Association.

Post-war period 
On June 20, 1953, the school was nationalized under R.A. NO. 908 and became the Bulacan National Trade School.

By virtue of Republic Act 1800, the Bulacan National Trade School was converted into the Bulacan School of Arts and Trades (BSAT) on July 1, 1957.  The school offered the two-year post-secondary courses with specializations in automotive, machine shop and girls' trade courses.

By virtue of Republic Act 4470, the Bulacan School of Arts and Trades (BSAT) was converted into the Bulacan College of Arts and Trades (BCAT) on June 19, 1965. The college began to expand its technical and technician course offerings by adding shop specialization.

In 1967, it offered the four-year Bachelor of Science in Industrial Education (BSIE) with majors in drafting, machine shop practice, woodworking and automotive, cosmetology, electronics and electricity.

From 1968 to 1973, the five-year engineering programs were added to the courses offered by the college.

In 1977, the college started offering graduate program, the Master of Arts in Teaching with majors in technical and vocational subjects.

In 1983, the college continued to expand its curricular offerings and develop its facilities to meet the needs of the growing student population. The teacher education curriculum added more major fields of specialization in secondary education. New majors in the engineering program were also added. Doctoral program was offered and new majors in the master's program were introduced.

Conversion into State University 
On December 30, 1993, President Fidel V. Ramos signed House Bill 461 into law, known as Republic Act 7665, which converted the Bulacan College of Arts and Trades into the Bulacan State University.

The conversion into a State University provided more impetus to the administration to implement a wide range of institutional development programs, which included upgrading of academic qualifications of faculty members, streamlining the curricular programs by creating colleges and institutes, securing state-of-the-art instructional facilities, physical plant development and expansion, and broadening access to education by establishing additional satellite campuses.

Recent history 
In 2002, a landmark agreement between the university and the Integrated Bar of the Philippines, Bulacan Chapter, was made to establish the BSI-J – Marcelo H. Del Pilar College of Law. The Marcelo H. Del Pilar Law Foundation, Inc. was created to support the program of the college. The move was hailed by The Technical Panel for Legal Education of the Commission on Higher Education as innovative being the first of its kind in the Philippines. The first batch of graduates of the college who took the 2006 Bar Examinations garnered an impressive passing average of 42.8 percent, higher than the national passing average of 30.6 percent.

In 2004, the university started to gain educational agreements with some nations in the Asia Pacific region namely in China, South Korea, and Hong Kong.

In 2007, the Accrediting Agency of Chartered Colleges and Universities (AACCUP), a member of Asia-Pacific Quality Network (APQN) and International Network of Quality Assurance Agencies in Higher Education (INQAAHE), granted Level III accreditation status to the elementary, secondary and industrial education programs of the College of Education. BulSU was the first State University in Central Luzon to be awarded a Level III Accreditation in its Education programs by the AACCUP.

In 2008, the university produced outstanding performance in licensure and bar examinations: 90% passing average in the June Nurse Licensure Examinations, 87% passing average in the November Nurse Licensure Examination and 32% passing average in the Bar Examinations. BulSU also ranked 3rd in the top schools for the Electronics and Communication Engineer Licensure Examination.

The university has been consistently performing well in the National Board Examinations with results exceeding the National Passing Rate and has produced individuals who were among the top performers in the board examinations.

The university recently received its ISO 9001:2015 Certification, passed the Level II Institutional Accreditation while 50 academic programs of the different Colleges are already accredited by the Accrediting Agency of Chartered Colleges and Universities (AACCUP).  To date, most of the Programs of the university have at least Level Il accredited status and gearing for Level III.

In 2018, Bulacan State University has undergone a massive reconstruction and upgrade of its facilities.

Campus

Main campus 
The BSU Main Campus is situated along MacArthur Highway in Brgy. Guinhawa, City of Malolos, Bulacan, Philippines.

Bahay-Saliksikan ng Bulacan 
The university's Bahay-Saliksikan ng Bulacan (Center for Bulacan Studies) was established on November 24, 1997, by the Samahang Pangkasaysayan ng Bulacan, Inc. (Historical Association of Bulacan, Inc.) with the assistance of Bulakeño (Bulakenyo) scholars including Jose Tantoco and Jaime Veneracio of the University of the Philippines Diliman, to collect, promote, study, and research Bulacan's rich and diverse history, culture, environment, and others that concern the province, that would help enforce and create public policies and programs for either the Province of Bulacan or the Republic of the Philippines. It is funded by the Provincial Government of Bulacan and since 2004 and listed by the Komisyon sa Wikang Filipino (Commission on the Filipino Language) as a Pambansang Alagad ng Wika (National Authority on the Filipino Language).

Smart-BulSU Wireless Laboratory 
To promote and upgrade the quality of engineering education, the university partnered with Smart Communications, Inc. on the Smart Wireless Engineering Education Program (SWEEP), the first industry-academe partnership in the country that seeks to improve the level of technology and engineering education, particularly in the field of Electronics and Communications Engineering (ECE). SWEEP was launched on March 28, 2003, with the inauguration of the "first wireless laboratory".

MEE-ART Center 
The faculty of the College of Engineering now trains technicians and engineers sent by local industries, visiting faculty, and senior students from different universities in the country. With industrial-type equipment and overseas-trained instructors, the university, through its Mechatronics Engineering – Automation Research and Training (MEE-ART) Center, offers a short-term training courses in basic and advanced pneumatics, industrial automation, mechatronics, electro-pneumatics, and programmable logic control.

Institute of Local Government Administration 
The Institute of Local Government Administration is the primary extension agency of BulSU. Instituted in 1995 in partnership with the Local Government Academy of the Department of Interior and Local Government and the provincial government of Bulacan, the Institute actively promotes the knowledge, skills attitudes and values that make for effective, efficient, responsive and service-oriented local governance in the cities and the countryside.

The institute provides Continuing Education, Technology Transfer and Consultancy,  Technology Job Information/Placement, Communications Media, Local Government Capability Building Program, Integrated Capability Building Program, Technology of Participation, Building Customer Service Skills, Action Planning Workshop, Public Service Excellence Program, Planning and Budgeting Workshop, Barangay Executive Training, Continuing Cooperative Training, Opinion Poll Survey, Moral Leadership and Peak Performance, Barangay Justice Service System, and Codification of Ordinance.

DOST-BulSU Food Testing Laboratory 
The laboratory has been performing different food testing services like microbiological tests, physico-chemical tests, and shelf-life testing.

CHED-DepED Teacher Training Center 
The Commission on Higher Education (CHED) has chosen the BulSU College of Education to be one of the training centers nationwide for teachers who want to be educated in areas beyond their specialization. As one of the 85 training centers all over the country chosen by CHED. Teachers in Central Luzon Region under the Department of Education underwent training for a certificate program.

BulSU Language Center 
Bulacan State University Language Center, located at the Malolos Campus, is an English language center, that works hand-in-hand with top universities in South Korea, Taiwan, Hong Kong and Mainland China.

Satellite campuses 
 Bustos Campus in Brgy. Poblacion, Bustos, Bulacan, the largest satellite campus, was established in 1976.
 Sarmiento Campus in City of San Jose del Monte, Bulacan was established in 1998.
 Meneses Campus in Brgy. Matungao, Bulakan, Bulacan was established in 2000.
 Consortium in Montessori De San Ildefonso in Brgy. San Juan, San Ildefonso, Bulacan was established in 2008.
 Hagonoy Campus in Brgy. Iba-Carillo, Hagonoy, Bulacan was established in 2011.
 Pulilan Campus in Brgy. Paltao, Pulilan, Bulacan was established in 2013.
 San Rafael Campus in San Rafael, Bulacan was established in 2022.
 Pulilan Campus in Brgy. Paltao, Pulilan, Bulacan was established in 2013.

International participation 
The new millennium saw Bulacan State University going global and participating in cross-border education with other Asian countries such as South Korea, Peoples Republic of China, Taiwan, Hong Kong, Singapore, and Malaysia. The university signed agreements with educational institutions in these countries for the offering of various programs of the BSU especially the doctoral and master's programs. The university, in partnerships with Korean institutions, also hosts Korean students for their English language course. These programs paved the way for the on-going students and faculty exchanges and visitations with those institutions abroad.

Hong Kong campus 
In 2003, BSU Hong Kong Campus in Nathan Road, Yaumatei, Hong Kong was institutionalized by virtue of a Memorandum of Agreement signed between Bulacan State University and Hong Kong Lifelong Education Organization (HKLEO).

The Hong Kong Campus was accredited and recognized by Commission on Higher Education (CHED), Accrediting Agency for Chartered Colleges and Universities in the Philippines (AACCUP), Inc., International Association of Universities (IAU) and the Ministry of Education of China.

Confucius Institute 
The Office of Chinese Language Council International signed an agreement with Bulacan State University on June 22, 2007, to jointly established a Confucius Institute. The institute was formally launched on February 28, 2009, with the Northwest University in Xi'an, China that serves as the Chinese partner of the Confucius Institute.

During the signing ceremony, it was announced that the Confucius Institute will offer various Chinese courses, conduct Chinese cultural activities and hold HSK examinations in the hope of meeting the demands of Filipinos for Chinese and strengthening communication and friendship between the two peoples.

The Confucius Institute at Bulacan State University is the second CI established in the country and the first CI in a state university.

Colleges 

Graduate School
BulSU College of Law
College of Architecture and Fine Arts
College of Arts and Letters
College of Business Administration
College of Criminal Justice Education
College of Education
College of Engineering
College of Hospitality and Tourism Management
College of Industrial Technology
College of Information and Communications Technology
College of Nursing
College of Science
College of Social Sciences and Philosophy
College of Sports, Exercise and Recreation
Laboratory High School

Gallery

References

External links 

 Official Bulacan State University Official Website

Universities and colleges in Bulacan
State universities and colleges in the Philippines
Philippine Association of State Universities and Colleges
Education in Malolos
Educational institutions established in 1904
1904 establishments in the Philippines